The 2018 Ladies' National Football League, known for sponsorship reasons as the Lidl Ladies' National Football League, is a ladies' Gaelic football competition taking place in early 2018.

For the first time, LNFL games were broadcast live on Eir Sport.

  were the winners, defeating  in the final.

Format

League structure
The 2018 Ladies' National Football League consists of four divisions of eight teams. Each team plays every other team in its division once. 3 points are awarded for a win and 1 for a draw.

If two teams are level on points, the tie-break is:
 winners of the head-to-head game are ranked ahead
 if the head-to-head match was a draw, then whichever team scored more points in the game is ranked ahead (e.g. 1-15 beats 2-12)
 if the head-to-head match was an exact draw, ranking is determined by the points difference (i.e. total scored minus total conceded in all games)
 if the points difference is equal, ranking is determined by the total scored

If three or more teams are level on league points, rankings are determined solely by points difference.

Finals, promotions and relegations
The top four teams in Division 1 contest the Ladies' National Football League semi-finals (first plays fourth and second plays third).

The top four teams in divisions 2, 3 and 4 contest the semi-finals of their respective divisions. The division champions are promoted.

The last-placed teams in divisions 1, 2 and 3 are relegated.

Division 1

Table

Kerry defeated Mayo, but Mayo were awarded the points as Kerry had fielded an ineligible player.
Galway are ranked ahead of Donegal because, although the head-to-head game was a draw, Galway scored more points (0-16 to 1-13).

Finals

Semi-finals

Final

Division 2

Table

Armagh v. Cavan was a draw (2-14 each); the teams are ranked by score difference.

Finals

Semi-finals

Final

Division 3

Table

Meath are ranked ahead of Down as they won the head-to-head game between the teams.
Kildare are ranked ahead of Roscommon as they won the head-to-head game between the teams.

Finals

Semi-finals

Final

Division 4

Antrim are ranked ahead of Fermanagh as they won the head-to-head game between the teams.

Finals

Semi-finals

Final

References

National Football League
Ladies' National Football League seasons